"I've Got My Eyes on You" is a popular song by Cole Porter, published in 1939 and written for the Hollywood musical film Broadway Melody of 1940 where it was introduced by Fred Astaire. Later that year, it was included in Andy Hardy's Private Secretary (1940) where it was sung by Kathryn Grayson.

The song is also played as background music by a band in the 1956 musical High Society, starring Frank Sinatra, Bing Crosby and Grace Kelly, and it was used in the 1940 comedy The Philadelphia Story starring Katharine Hepburn and Cary Grant, in which it was played at the party the night before the wedding.

The song has since been recorded by a number of artists, including by Patti Page for her album In the Land of Hi-Fi (1956), Fred Astaire for his album The Astaire Story (1952) and by Dianne Reeves (in 2005) for the Grammy Award-winning soundtrack to Good Night, and Good Luck.

References 

Songs written by Cole Porter
1939 songs
Fred Astaire songs